Lebanon  is a city in Grafton County, New Hampshire, United States. The population was 14,282 at the 2020 census, up from 13,151 at the 2010 census. Lebanon is in western New Hampshire, south of Hanover, near the Connecticut River. It is the home to Dartmouth–Hitchcock Medical Center and Dartmouth College's Geisel School of Medicine, together comprising the largest medical facility between Boston, Massachusetts, and Burlington, Vermont.

Together with Hanover, New Hampshire, and White River Junction, Vermont, Lebanon is at the center of a Micropolitan Statistical Area, encompassing nearly 30 towns along the upper Connecticut River valley.

History 

Lebanon was chartered as a town by colonial governor Benning Wentworth on July 4, 1761, one of 16 along the Connecticut River. It was named for Lebanon, Connecticut, from where many early settlers had come or would come, including the Rev. Eleazar Wheelock, who arrived in 1770 and founded Dartmouth College. Lebanon, Connecticut, was the original home of Moor's Charity School, the antecedent of Dartmouth College.

Early settlement concentrated along the Connecticut River in what is now West Lebanon, and in the Mascoma Lake region near Enfield. In the mid-19th century, a mill district developed at falls on the Mascoma River. Industries included, at various times, furniture mills, a tannery, several machine shops, a woolen textile mill, and a clothing factory. In the mid-19th century, this district attracted many French workers from Canada's Quebec province. This became the center of town, although West Lebanon grew into a railroad hub with a separate identity after lines entered from Boston. This rail center would become known as "Westboro" after two trains collided when West Lebanon was mistaken for Lebanon.

The mill district, like the railroad, declined into the 1950s and 1960s. The town suffered two major fires; the second, in 1964, destroyed a large portion of the old mill district. Reconstruction resulted in a controversial urban renewal project featuring a closed-off district, called The Mall, built to replace the destroyed Hanover Street area. Partly in defiance of economic decline, and partly to counter a movement by West Lebanon to declare itself an independent town, Lebanon re-incorporated as a city in 1958.

The routing of Interstates 89 and 91 through Lebanon and nearby White River Junction, Vermont, in addition to the growth of Dartmouth College, led to the area's economic revival. The former mill town now has a mixed economy based on education, medical services, high-technology and retail. Just south of the village of West Lebanon, a major shopping district has sprung up at the intersection of Route 12A and I-89. Lebanon has undertaken improvements to its recreational facilities, including miles of hiking trails, a municipal ski area, a swimming pool and several sports fields.

In 1991, the Dartmouth–Hitchcock Medical Center, along with most departments of Dartmouth Medical School, moved from Hanover to a new campus just south of the Lebanon-Hanover town line. A number of medical and high-tech firms have located facilities near the medical center campus. TomTom, a leading worldwide developer of mapping databases, has its North American headquarters in Lebanon. Novo Nordisk and Microsoft also have major facilities here.

Geography
The western boundary of Lebanon is the Connecticut River, which is also the state boundary with Vermont. The village of West Lebanon occupies the western part of the city, along the Connecticut River. The city is fully within the Connecticut River watershed. The southern end of Moose Mountain is in the northeast.

Climate

According to the Köppen Climate Classification system, Lebanon has a warm-summer humid continental climate, abbreviated "Dfb" on climate maps.

Demographics 

As of the census of 2010, there were 13,151 people, 6,186 households, and 3,269 families residing in the city. The population density was 326.2 people per square mile (125.9/km2). There were 6,649 housing units at an average density of 164.9 per square mile (63.7/km2). The racial makeup of the city was 88.4% White, 1.6% African American, 0.30% Native American, 6.8% Asian, 0.00% Pacific Islander, 0.80% some other race, and 2.10% from two or more races. Hispanic or Latino of any race were 2.9% of the population.

There were 6,186 households, out of which 24.2% had children under the age of 18 living with them, 40.5% were married couples living together, 8.9% had a female householder with no husband present, 3.4% had a male householder with no wife present, and 47.2% were non-families. 36.8% of all households were made up of individuals, and 12.4% were someone living alone who was 65 years of age or older. The average household size was 2.10, and the average family size was 2.76.

In the city, the population was spread out, with 20.5% from age 0-19, 6.3% from 20 to 24, 30.3% from 25 to 44, 27.6% from 45 to 64, and 15.3% who were 65 years of age or older. The median age was 39.4 years. The male population was 47.4% of the total, while the female population was 52.6%.

For the period 2011–2015, the estimated median annual income for a household in the city was $53,004, and the median income for a family was $75,511. Male full-time workers had a median income of $51,735 versus $48,836 for females. The per capita income for the city was $36,370. About 8.7% of families and 12.3% of the entire population were below the poverty line, including 22.6% of those under 18 and 5.0% of those age 65 and over.

Government and politics 
The city government consists of a council–manager system. The city council consists of nine members elected to two-year terms. Six members are elected from three wards, each electing two members, and the other two are elected at large. 

Politically the city is strongly Democratic. Joe Biden received 74% of the vote to Donald Trump's 25% in the 2020 United States presidential election.

Education
Lebanon has its own elementary schools, middle school, and high school. Students from neighboring towns (Grantham and Plainfield) attend high school in Lebanon. On October 15, 2010, the city broke ground on a new middle school for grades 5–8 to replace an aging junior high facility and overcrowded elementary school facilities. Lebanon Middle School was completed in 2012.

Located on the downtown pedestrian mall is the Lebanon campus of Claremont-based River Valley Community College. Also downtown, the Alliance for the Visual Arts (AVA) offers classes in arts and crafts in a LEED-certified former factory building, which houses a ground floor gallery space. Many departments of Dartmouth College's Geisel School of Medicine are additionally located just north of downtown at Dartmouth–Hitchcock Medical Center.

Transportation

Roads and highways

Lebanon is served by Interstate 89, which meets Interstate 91 just across the Connecticut River in White River Junction. U.S. Route 4 passes east–west through the centers of Lebanon and West Lebanon, leading east to Enfield and eventually Concord, and west towards Rutland, Vermont. New Hampshire Route 10 leads south from Lebanon along Interstate 89, eventually diverging to go to Newport. Route 10 leads north from West Lebanon into Hanover and points north along the Connecticut River. New Hampshire Route 120 passes north–south through downtown Lebanon, leading north into Hanover and south to Claremont. New Hampshire Route 12A begins in West Lebanon and heads south along the Connecticut River to Claremont. Near the eastern border of the city, New Hampshire Route 4A leaves US 4 to travel southeast towards Wilmot and central New Hampshire.

Public transportation
Lebanon Airport, adjacent to West Lebanon, has passenger service to Boston and New York City provided by Cape Air. Free public bus service for the major towns in the area including Lebanon is provided by Advance Transit, with weekday service to destinations such as Dartmouth–Hitchcock Medical Center, shopping plazas in West Lebanon, the villages of Lebanon and West Lebanon, as well as Hanover and White River Junction. Southeast Vermont Transit also provides a peak direction commuter bus route between DHMC to Bellows Falls, Vermont that also runs on weekdays.

The closest Greyhound bus terminal and Amtrak train station are both located in White River Junction, Vermont. Vermont Translines also serves Lebanon from the Dartmouth–Hitchcock Medical Center.

Culture 
Downtown Lebanon is a cultural hub with attractions such as the Lebanon Opera House (in City Hall), the AVA Gallery, seasonal Farmers' Market and summer concerts on the green. Opera North, based in the city, is the region's oldest professional opera company.

Lebanon Public Library, located downtown on East Park Street, is the primary library in the city, and the Kilton Public Library branch serves West Lebanon. Kilton was the first library in the U.S. to host a node of the Tor anonymity network.

The Carter Community Building Association (CCBA) operates an after-school activity center for primary school children and a fitness center for teens and adults. Salt Hill Pub frequently features live musical performances.

Colburn Park 
The Colburn Park Historic District is at the heart of Lebanon, consisting of Colburn Park and buildings around it—and many 19th-century buildings immediately adjacent to these. The district was listed on the National Register of Historic Places in 1986. The land that later developed into the park was donated in 1792 by Robert Colburn as the site for the community's meeting house, serving the purposes of church and town hall. Arterial roads were built to the area, and it began to develop as a commercial and civic center in the early 19th century. A weekly farmers' market is held there between June and September along with many community activities throughout the year.

Notable people 

 Nick Alexander (born 1988), 2010 and 2014 US Olympic Team ski jumper
 Aaron Baddeley (born 1981), golfer with the PGA Tour; born in Lebanon
 Minnie Willis Baines Miller (1845–1923), author
 William Wallace Smith Bliss (1815-1853), army officer and mathematician
 Duane R. Bushey (born 1944), naval officer
 Thomas C. Chalmers (1917–1995), physician, researcher
 Benjamin Champney (1817–1907), landscape painter 
 Harry Morrison Cheney (1860–1937), Speaker of New Hampshire House of Representatives
 Buff Cobb (1927–2010), actress and talk-show host
 Norris Cotton (1900–1989), US senator
 Aaron H. Cragin (1821–1898), politician
 Lane Dwinell (1906–1997), manufacturer
 Experience Estabrook (1813–1894), lawyer, politician
 Jeff Friedman (born 1950), poet
 Phineas Gage (1823–1860), railroad foreman, massive brain-injury survivor
 Arlie Latham (1860-1952), professional baseball player
 Jedediah Hyde Lathrop (1806-1889), merchant
 Charley Parkhurst (1812–1879), stagecoach driver
 Elisha Payne (1731-1807), businessman and politician
 George Halsey Perley (1857–1938), politician, diplomat
 Phineas Quimby (1802–1866), philosopher
 Colleen Randall (born 1952), artist
 Hezekiah Bradley Smith (1816–1887), inventor
 Joseph Smith (1805–1844), religious leader, founder of Mormonism and the Latter Day Saint movement
 George Storrs (1796–1879), writer who influenced many Christian denominations, including Seventh-day Adventists and Bible Students (later Jehovah's Witnesses)
 Sarah Strohmeyer (born 1962), author
 William Ticknor (1810–1864), publisher
 Mia Tyler (born 1978), model, actress
 Rob Woodward (born 1962), pitcher with the Boston Red Sox, radio host
 Ammi B. Young (1798–1874), architect

References

External links
 
 Lebanon Historical Society
 Lebanon Public Libraries
 Lebanon School District
 New Hampshire Economic and Labor Market Information Bureau Profile

 
1761 establishments in New Hampshire
Cities in Grafton County, New Hampshire
Cities in New Hampshire
Lebanon micropolitan area
Populated places established in 1761
New Hampshire populated places on the Connecticut River